is a PK-12 international school in Sawara-ku, Fukuoka, Japan. It was established in 1972 since the U.S. Air Force Base School had stopped operations.

References

External links
 Fukuoka International School

Elementary schools in Japan
Schools in Fukuoka Prefecture
International schools in Japan
High schools in Fukuoka Prefecture
1972 establishments in Japan
Educational institutions established in 1972